Dual specificity protein phosphatase 18 is an enzyme that is encoded by the DUSP18 gene in humans.

References

Further reading

External links 
 PDBe-KB provides an overview of all the structure information available in the PDB for Human Dual specificity protein phosphatase 18 (DUSP18)

EC 3.1.3